Shailagh Jane Murray (born October 9, 1965) is an American university administrator, former political aide and journalist who served as a senior advisor to U.S. President Barack Obama. She previously served as deputy chief of staff and communications director for Vice President Joe Biden.

Career
Murray worked for The Wall Street Journal from 1999 to 2005. She then became Capitol Hill correspondent for The Washington Post, covering the elections of 2006, 2008 and 2010.

She joined the Office of the Vice President in 2011 as communications director and was later promoted to deputy chief of staff.

In March 2015, she was named as the successor to Dan Pfeiffer as senior advisor to the President with a communications portfolio.

In September 2018, she was appointed executive vice president for public affairs of Columbia University.

References

External links

1965 births
Living people
20th-century American journalists
20th-century African-American women
20th-century African-American people
21st-century American journalists
21st-century American women
American newspaper reporters and correspondents
American women in politics
Columbia University faculty
New York (state) Democrats
Northwestern University alumni
Obama administration personnel
Senior Advisors to the President of the United States
University of Missouri alumni
The Wall Street Journal people
The Washington Post journalists
Writers from Buffalo, New York